Vexillum cernohorskyi is an extinct species of sea snail, a marine gastropod mollusk, in the family Costellariidae, the ribbed miters.

Description
The length of the shell attains 8.2 mm, its diameter 2.7 mm.

Distribution
Fossils of this marine species were found in late Miocene strata in the Eniwetok Atoll .

References

External links
 [http:// https://doi.org/10.3133/pp533  Ladd, H.S. (1977). Cenozoic fossil mollusks from western Pacific islands; Gastropods (Eratoidae through Harpidae). U.S. Geological Survey Professional Paper. 533: i–iv, 1–84, pls 1–23]

cernohorskyi
Gastropods described in 1977